Austrocactus is a genus of cacti with ten species endemic of southern South America, in Argentina and Chile.

They have solitary or branched bodies, the ribs are usually divided into tubercules (except Austrocactus spiniflorus). The tallest species in this genus is 80 centimeters. Flowers are pink, orange, red or yellow with a characteristic spiny tube.

Species

Ribs divided into tubercles:
 stems upright
 large stems (>25 cm)
 Austrocactus bertinii
 Austrocactus dusenii – synonym of Austrocactus bertinii
 Austrocactus intertextus sensu Speg.
 Austrocactus patagonicus – synonym of Austrocactus bertinii
 smaller stems (<25 cm)
 Austrocactus ferrarii
 Austrocactus longicarpus
 Austrocactus philippii
 stems prostrate
 stems with adventitious roots
 Austrocactus colloncurensis
 Austrocactus coxii
 Austrocactus gracilis – synonym of Austrocactus coxii
 Austrocactus hibernus
 stems without adventitious roots
 Austrocactus subandinus

Ribs smooth:
 Austrocactus spiniflorus

References

External links 
Cactiguide.com: Austrocactus

Cactoideae
Cactoideae genera
Cacti of South America
Flora of Argentina
Flora of Chile
Flora of Colombia
Flora of Ecuador
Flora of Peru